Peter Felicetti is a Canadian former soccer general manager and head coach who had notable stints in the Canadian Soccer League and American Professional Soccer League.

Career 
In 1980, he managed in the Toronto and District Soccer League with Monteleone, and secured the Consols Cup. In 1982, he managed Ciociaro in the Toronto and District Soccer League, and Satellite in the Amicizia Soccer League. Felicetti served as the technical director in 1988 for the North York Rockets in the Canadian Soccer League. In 1989, he was named the head coach for North York after Mirko Bazic was dismissed on August 21, 1989. In 1990, he was dismissed from his post after the North York management declined to renew his contract for the 1990 CSL season.

In 1991, he served as the head coach for Toronto Italia in the National Soccer League, where he received the NSL Coach of the Year award after securing the NSL Championship for Toronto. In 1994, he was appointed head coach for Toronto Rockets in the American Professional Soccer League. He was later replaced by Hector Leonardo Marinaro.

Honors  
Toronto Italia
NSL Championship: 1991
Monteleone
Toronto and District Soccer League Consols Cup: 1980
Individual  
 NSL Coach of the Year: 1991

References 
 

Canadian soccer coaches
American Professional Soccer League coaches
Canadian National Soccer League coaches